Gymnocranius euanus, the Japanese large-eye bream, is a species of emperor native to the Indo Pacific found at depths of 15 to 50 meters. The average length of this species is 35 cm.

References

External links
 Paddletail Seabream @ Fishes of Australia

Lethrinidae
Fauna of Queensland
Marine fish of Southeast Asia
Fish described in 1879
Taxa named by Albert Günther